Certain Women was an Australian television soap opera created by prominent Australian TV dramatist Tony Morphett and produced by the Australian Broadcasting Commission between 1973 and 1976. There were a total of 166 fifty-minute episodes. Episodes 1–59 were produced in black and white and, starting in with the introduction of colour broadcasting in Australia in 1975, episodes 60–166 were produced and broadcast in color.

Program synopsis
The idea for the series reportedly grew out of Morphett's frustration with the lack of good roles for female actors on Australian TV at the time. The series premiered as a six-part mini-series, with each episode dealing with a different member of the Stone/Lucas family: Gillian (Elisabeth Crosby), Marjorie (Judy Morris), Helen (Jenny Lee), Jane (Joan Bruce), Freda (June Salter) and Dolly (Queenie Ashton). The mini-series proved to be so popular that the format was revised into an ongoing series.

Other cast members in the series included Christine Amor, Diane Craig, Anne Haddy, Shane Porteous, Ron Graham, Peter Sumner, Kris McQuade, Betty Lucas, Vincent Ball, Brian Wenzel, Carmen Duncan, Jack Fegan, Bruce Spence, Sigrid Thornton, Carole Skinner, John Stanton, Kate Fitzpatrick and Charles Tingwell.

Screening schedule in Australia

Certain Women was very popular and after initially being screened in February 1973 with just six episodes, as tv plays, it returned to Australias TV screens on 10 October 1973.The second series consisted of 26 episodes. The main screening of Certain Women was on Wednesday evening, commencing at 8.00 pm after ABC's current affairs program This Day Tonight.

The same main characters from the original six tv plays returned – solicitor Freda Lucas (June Salter), her widowed mother Dolly (Queenie Ashton), Dolly’s elder daughter Jane (Joan Bruce), as did the Stone families other three daughters (Marjorie, Helen and Gillian), plus their son Damon, and Marjorie’s husband, Carl Faber.

New to the second series were a young doctor, Julius Primmer (known as Big Julie), and an NCO in the regular Army, Barry Gardiner (Brian Wenzel), plus a young nurse from the country, called Michelle. Other actors appearing in the series included Judy Morris. Peter Sumner and Jenny Lee.

By mid 1976, Certain Women had moved to 8.30 pm, following the ABC show The Inventors. Sunday evenings saw the preceding weekly episode repeated at around 10.30 pm.

Cancellation

The period 1975–1978 saw many changes to the Australian Government owned, Australian Broadcasting Commission (ABC). At the time, there was an impetus by the Government to cut the ABC's overall operating costs and budget. By mid 1976, the ABC announced that the 1976 season of Certain Women, would be its last. The final episode of Certain Women was screened in Australia in its usual Wednesday evening time slot, on 22 December 1976. Despite the series still having continued popularity, it had simply fallen victim to the ABC's budget cuts.

When the series folded, many of the actors went on to other series on Australian commercial television. A package of Certain Women episodes was also sold and screened on television, in the United Kingdom. It was however not repeated in Australia, as in most cases the repeat had already been shown on ABC television the following Sunday night.

Existing ABC Videotape

Originally it was thought all or most of the 166 episodes had either been junked or wiped. According to a 1999 article by Bob Ellis (whose wife Anne Brooksbank wrote for the series), almost all but a handful of the episodes of Certain Women were subsequently wiped by the ABC, although episodes were still being shown as late as 1981, on British television.

However, in early 2016, it was revealed that about a third of the series was still in existence and had previously undergone preservation. The remaining 50 episodes are mainly from the latter two colour seasons from 1975 and 1976. In 2006, these were digitised for preservation by the ABC. However their future for broadcasting or any DVD release remains unknown.

All or most of the other episodes from the 1973-74 black and white era of the program, have either been fully junked or erased. However, there are various filming inserts for the missing episodes which have survived and been kept. These are not complete episodes but are outdoor filming scenes which were then dropped into the final program.

Theme music

The main title theme track for the Certain Women series exists in the ABC sound library. From time to time, it has been included on various ABC TV theme music compact discs, available on commercial release.

Archival clips from the series

The ABC has placed online, a short black and white clip from an early Certain Women episode, which has survived. This is available to view on the ABC website, using the timeline feature.

Featured in the clip, are Certain Women cast regulars Joan Bruce, as Jane Stone and Ron Graham, as husband Alan Stone. In the clip, they are visiting their daughter. However, there is a surprise for them. Jane and Alan discover their daughter has a new boyfriend Julius, played by well known famous Australian actor, Bruce Spence. Clip is from the 1973 season of the show.

http://abc.net.au/tv/50years/timeline/index.html?programID=23

The Australian National Film & Sound Archive website has short excerpts of the final episode of Certain Women, (episode number 166), which was originally screened in December 1976. It has placed a couple of 2-minute excerpts from the episode on its website, for viewing. This is available on the following link.

http://aso.gov.au/titles/tv/certain-women-episode-166/

References

External links
 
Certain Women at the National Film and Sound Archive All scripts for the show plus 70's ABC publicity material.
Certain Women at AustLit

1973 Australian television series debuts
1976 Australian television series endings
Australian television soap operas
Australian Broadcasting Corporation original programming
Black-and-white Australian television shows
English-language television shows